BMW S1000RR is a race oriented sport bike initially made by BMW Motorrad to compete in the 2009 Superbike World Championship, that is now in commercial production. It was introduced in Munich in April 2008, and is powered by a  four-cylinder engine redlined at 14,200 rpm.

BMW made 1,000 S1000RRs in 2009 to satisfy World Superbike homologation requirements, but expanded production for commercial sale of the bike in 2010. It has a standard anti-lock braking system, with an optional electronic traction control. With  to the rear wheel, it was the most powerful motorcycle in the class on the dyno.

History

2009–2011 

The bike came factory fitted with ABS and dynamic traction control, a first for road-going superbike at the time. On top of this, it came standard with three riding modes (Wet, Sport and Race) with an additional riding mode (Slick) available only after connecting a dongle, that you received with the bike, to a special jack under the seat. It was also the first production motorcycle to offer an optional quick shifter. This is a clutchless shifter that allowed you to upshift with no clutch actuation even at full throttle. After the initial delivery of motorcycles the factory started shipping them with a software governor that limited RPM to 9000 for a short break in period that was later removed by the dealers. The 2011 bike remained unchanged, keeping the same livery options, engine, chassis and suspension.

2012 
In 2012, the bike received slightly more significant changes. It was given a new face of the tachometer as well as new throttle maps for each of the four riding modes, to combat throttle response issues that customers were facing with the bike. To further aid this issue, BMW updated the throttle tube to be lighter and have a shorter pull. The intake and exhaust systems also received updates, the ram air intake was made to be 20% larger, as well as moving the catalytic converters to the muffler from the headers. This allowed for the oil sump heat shield to be removed, saving a small amount of weight. The optional DTC (Dynamic Traction Control) was also updated, smoothing the butterfly valve action when a wheelie was detected, providing a less violent intervention to the bikes front wheel lifting off the ground. The wheelbase was also reduced by nearly  through a tooth addition in the rear sprocket (45). The triple clamp on top of the fork was also updated to a forged aluminium component. Lastly, the spring rates and valving in the suspension were overhauled, including special check valves to allow for completely independent compression and rebound adjustment, coupled with a 10-way adjustable steering damper. The 2012 visual updates included new heel plates, a slimmer-looking tail section and reshaped side panels with plastic winglets said to improve aerodynamics at speed. Smaller visual updates included grilles on the side of the tank plastics and a new "RR" logo.

2013 and HP4 
In 2013 the bike did not receive updates to the same extent as the 2012 bike. However, BMW introduced the HP4 variant, a more track-oriented version of the standard S1000RR. The 2013 HP4 saw the ride-by-wire system again taken to a level unseen outside of the WSBK and MotoGP. The HP4 was fitted with a Dynamic Dampening Control (DDC) system that updates and makes changes to the suspension every 11 milliseconds, responding to various sensors as well as throttle input and is adjustable on the fly, a first on any production motorcycle. The bike was given an electronic controlled interference pipe and acoustic valves, allowing air to flow into the exhaust and burn unused fuel as well as upgraded Brembo Monobloc brake calipers. The riding modes of the HP4 differ from the standard bike, in that it allows for all  to be accessed in four modes. The HP4 also introduced combined braking, meaning that in all modes except slick, the back brake is applied automatically when the rider applies the front brake. It was offered in multiple race kit packages, ranging from the stock claimed  of the S1000RR all the way up to a claimed . The 2013 HP4 was also equipped with more electronic features, launch control and pit-mode, all accessible from the controls on the handlebars. The bike was also given its own colorway and an HP4-specific tachometer face. Also available at extra cost was a competition and premium package which included HP carbon engine belly pan, side spoilers and trim, HP folding clutch and brake levers, HP adjustable rider footrests, standard forged wheels finished in Racing Blue Metallic, a decal kit, (optional) heated grips, a pillion rider kit and an anti-theft alarm.

2014 and HP4 

The 2014 S1000RR saw some more minor updates and the first race-ABS as standard. The handlebars were also slightly modified, as well as some very minor changes to the fairings. The HP4 variant was sold for the second year with no major changes; available at extra cost was a premium package which included HP carbon engine spoiler and trim, HP folding clutch and brake levers, HP adjustable rider footrests, standard forged wheels finished in Racing Blue Metallic, a decal kit, heated grips, a pillion rider kit and an anti-theft alarm.

2015 
In 2015, the S1000RR saw major updates and changes. This was achieved through reshaping the ports, a new cam profile, lighter valves and shorter velocity stacks drawing from a larger airbox. An all-new exhaust has also been implemented, drawing from the previous years HP4, adding a controlled interference pipe and acoustic valves. More options made available in the 2015 variant were included in the "Dynamic Package" which included BMW's Quickshift Assist Pro, allowing for clutchless up and downshifts. BMW also introduced a "Race Package" which gave the user DDC from the HP4, a "Pro" riding mode as well as launch control, a customizable pit limiter and cruise control. To the electronics, BMW again added smoother front wheel lift intervention and a new "User" mode, where the rider is able to customize some defined parameters, allowing for a fully personalized riding experience. More learnings from the HP4 include combined braking (automatically activating the rear brake when the front brake is applied), on-the-fly ABS and DTC control and lean angle sensors that provide a readout on the dash. The 2015 bikes lighter chassis consists of four individual aluminium cast pieces welded together with the engine tilted forward at a 32 degree angle and integrated as a load-bearing element. The new chassis geometry provides increased rider feedback from the front end the rear wheel. The visual updates to the S1000RR were also vast, with the asymmetric headlights being swapped (high beam left, low beam right), a softer nose and all new colorways. The muffler was changed to a larger can, while the fairings became more aerodynamically advanced adding vents and slips to allow for better stability at high speed.

2017 
In 2017, a non-street legal, track-only variant, the HP4 Race was added, made in a limited production run of 750 units.

2019 
The S1000RR received a full model change for 2019 at the November 2018 EICMA, Milan, Italy. This new engine employs BMW ShiftCam technology on the intake side, which varies intake valve timing and lift. The system has sliding concentric outer shafts, with two different cam profiles on them, on a splined inner shaft with the drive on one end. An ECU-controlled motor switches between low- and high-speed cams at 9,000 rpm in under 10 milliseconds, which produce soft, low-lift, short-duration cams for low-down and midrange torque, then a more aggressive profile cams for peak power production. The outer shafts are moved by a movable pin engaging in a cammed slot on the shaft, which slides the outer camshaft section left and right as needed. BMW claims the addition of this system gives the S1000RR a more linear torque curve than its predecessor.

This was achieved through the use of specialized parts, like hollow-bored titanium intake valves and new DLC rocker arms that are said to be 25% lighter. The camshafts are now directly powered by the crankshaft, thus eliminating the need for the previous idler gear. The water and oil pumps are combined into one component for a compact design. The exhaust system is also  lighter on the 2019 model, which contributes to a total  loss in comparison to its predecessor.

To harness the power output, BMW gave the S1000RR a package of electronics suite of rider aids, including ABS Pro (cornering ABS), Dynamic Traction Control (DTC), Dynamic Traction Control Wheelie Function, Shift Assistant Pro (which allows for clutchless up and downshifts), Hill Start Control (HSC), Launch Control and Pit Lane Limiter. There are four preset riding modes: "Rain", "Road", "Dynamic" and "Race", as well as three "Pro" modes, which can be custom tuned and come with a three-stage engine-braking adjustment.

The chassis has been revamped for the 2019 S1000RR, which is focusing on weight reduction while improving handling. BMW Dynamic Damping Control (DDC) semi-active suspension is still available on the S1000RR as an option, which has been enhanced with updated damping settings. The fuel tank and seat design are now slimmer. The front fairing is narrower and more aerodynamic than its predecessor, also housing twin symmetrical LED headlights, with the intake directly centered at the front for optimum airflow. The instrumentation now uses a 6.5-inch TFT display, which has four preset settings.

The M package, the first of any BMW motorcycle, is available, which includes motorsport paint finish, M carbon fiber wheels, an M lightweight battery, M Chassis Kit with rear ride height adjustment and swingarm pivot, the M Sport seat and a "Pro" riding mode.

M1000RR 2021 
The higher-spec variant of the S1000RR, called M1000RR, was unveiled in September 2020 intended as a basis for racing but still road legal. The first BMW motorcycle to carry the 'M' prefix normally associated with cars, the machine has extensive modifications in powerplant, chassis, exhaust and braking. The fairing has aerodynamic winglets that provide downforce.

2022 
Three variants of the S1000 RR announced on 30 September 2022 are the M package, Style Passion and Black Storm Metallic. BMW India launched the S1000 RR in the country on 10 December 2022, with deliveries scheduled to begin in February 2023.

Updates include:
 new front design with improved aerodynamics
 high windscreen
 a new steering angle sensor with Brake Slide Assist and Slide Control
 integration of M components and improvements to the electronics and crucial processes for modifying the bike for use on the race tracks
 short licence plate holder
 optional tail-hump cover for the passenger seat
 updated TFT display
 210 horsepower

The M package includes:
 Exclusive Light White/M Motorsport paint
 M Sport seat for optimum support
 M race cover kit for rear seat
 Weight-optimized M Carbon wheels with M graphics or the alternatively available M forged wheels.
 Updated M winglets that provide increased downforce at speed
 M braking system
 Milled parts for foot and hand controls.

Road racing

Race bike differences 
The factory race bike used in the Superbike World Championship differs in a number of ways from the production bike.
The race bike has a  Öhlins forks, compared with a  ZF Sachs forks. Until 2012, it had a 16.5-inch front wheel and a 16-inch rear wheel instead of a 17-inch (for 2013 World Superbike season, 17-inch rims became mandatory) and an MRA racing 'double-bubble' windshield.

Superbike World Championship 
On 26 June 2008, Spanish rider Rubén Xaus signed to ride the bike for the factory BMW Motorrad team. On 25 September 2008, Australian former double Superbike World Champion Troy Corser signed to complete the team's two-rider lineup for 2009. In the 2009 Superbike World Championship season, the highest race result achieved by Corser was fifth place in the Czech Republic, and Xaus achieved seventh place in Italy.

During the 2010 FIM Superstock 1000 Championship season, Ayrton Badovini dominated by winning every single race but one on the S1000RR. This result was significant because the Superstock class of WSBK is where the machines most closely resemble the stock offerings at the showroom.
On 13 May 2012, Italian rider Marco Melandri riding for the factory BMW Motorrad team was the first to secure a win for the S1000RR in World Superbike competition at the British round in Donington Park. His teammate Leon Haslam came in second giving BMW a "One Two" finish.

MotoGP CRT Class 
On 2012 Qatar Grand Prix, US rider Colin Edwards rode a S1000RR engined motorcycle for the Forward Racing team. This history making inaugural CRT Class debut, where 1,000 cc tuned factory production motorcycle engines competed for the first time alongside the current MotoGP machines. The S1000RR engined Suter machine placed first in its class and finished 12th overall.

Isle of Man TT 
The S1000RR has been used by various riders at the Isle of Man TT since 2010. On 31 May 2014, Michael Dunlop won the superbike class race on his factory-prepared bike entered by Hawk Racing, a UK-based BSB team operating as Buildbase BMW Motorrad, breaking a 75-year gap between wins for BMW. Three days later, Dunlop repeated his victory in the Superstock class, running under his own MD Racing BMW banner. He stated "...this is a great result for BMW. It’s great for a manufacturer when a road bike wins a TT”. Dunlop completed a hat-trick of BMW victories with a Senior TT win on Friday, 6 June.

Dunlop won the Superbike and Senior races at the 2016 TT festival on essentially the same machine, again provided by Hawk Racing, setting a new absolute solo-machine course record, averaging , set during one-lap of the six-lap event held on the 37-mile road course.

Macau Grand Prix 
Peter Hickman won the Macau Grand Prix in 2015 and 2016.

Marketing 

In March 2010, BMW released a video on YouTube titled "The oldest trick in the world", which highlighted the S1000RR's acceleration by pulling a tablecloth off a long 20-seat dining table without disturbing the place settings and table decorations.
Its popularity turned the ad viral, with 1.4 million views in the first ten days, and more than 3.7 million views .
The October 27, 2010 MythBusters episode "Tablecloth Chaos" tested whether the trick could be reproduced. The stunt was replicated in detail, with the exception that a different and less powerful motorcycle was used—a Buell 1125R, owned and ridden by the show's co-presenter Jamie Hyneman. The opinion of the television program was that the video was fake as the only way it could be reproduced was by placing a plastic sheet on top of the tablecloth—thus eliminating any contact between the tablecloth and the table settings.

Recall 
BMW issued a recall for bikes built between Sept. 1, 2011, through April 10, 2012 to address an issue with bolts that secure the connecting rods to the crankshaft that could loosen when the bike is ridden at high speed.

Specifications

Performance

Awards 
 Motorcycle News (United Kingdom) "Machine of the Year" and "Sports Bike over 751cc" 2010
 Cycle World Best Superbike of 2010
motorcycle.com Motorcycle of the Year 2010
 Robb Report Best of the Best 2010
 Motorcyclist Motorcycle of the Year 2010

See also 
 List of fastest production motorcycles by acceleration

References

External links 

S1000RR production model at BMW Motorrad International
3-times British Superbike Champion, Niall Mackenzie's S1000RR review

S1000RR
Sport bikes
Motorcycles introduced in 2008